Gregory Louis Fenves (born March 1, 1957) is a structural engineer, professor and college administrator who is the twenty-first president of Emory University in Atlanta, Georgia.  

Fenves was elected a member of the National Academy of Engineering in 2014 for contributions to computational modeling, creation of open source software for earthquake engineering analysis, and academic leadership.

Education and career 
Fenves was educated at Cornell University where he received a bachelor's degree (BS) in engineering with distinction in 1979 and was a member of the Quill and Dagger society. He went on to earn a master's degree (MSE) in 1980 and a PhD in 1984 from the University of California, Berkeley.

He began his career as an assistant professor in the Department of Civil, Architectural and Environmental Engineering at UT Austin from 1984 to 1987. He was on the faculty of UC Berkeley for more than 20 years and served as chair of the Department of Civil and Environmental Engineering from 2002 to 2007.

He is an internationally recognized structural engineer and led the development of one of the most widely used open-source software platforms in the civil engineering profession. He was one of the pioneers in developing wireless sensor networks for assessing the structural health of buildings, bridges and infrastructure and has focused his research on the simulation of structures subjected to earthquakes.

In 2008, he was appointed as the eighth dean of the Cockrell School of Engineering at UT Austin and served in that capacity for five years. From 2013 to 2015, he was appointed to the role as executive vice president and provost of UT Austin.  Fenves then served as the twenty-ninth president of UT Austin from June 2015 to June 2020.

On April 7, 2020, it was announced that Fenves would become the twenty-first president of Emory University, a position he assumed on August 1, 2020.

The University of Texas at Austin 

In 2015, his administration successfully defended UT Austin's admissions practices before the US Supreme Court. The landmark ruling in the Fisher v. University of Texas at Austin case enabled UT Austin to continue using race as a factor in its admissions process.

Fenves was instrumental in the founding of UT Austin's Dell Medical School — the first medical school in nearly 50 years to be built from the ground up at a top-tier research university — which opened in 2016  and graduated its inaugural class of physicians in 2020.

In 2017 Fenves received the "Guardian of the Human Spirit" award from Holocaust Museum Houston. In 2018, he received the "Hope for Humanity" award from the Dallas Holocaust Museum/Center for Education & Tolerance. During the acceptance speeches for both awards, Fenves discussed his family's history of loss and survival during the holocaust.

In 2018, UT Austin posted the highest four-year graduation rates in the university's history, 69.8%, an increase of over 17 percentage points since 2012.

In 2018, Fenves introduced the Texas Advance Commitment to increase affordability by providing assured financial aid for low- and middle-income UT Austin students. In 2019, the UT System Board of Regents approved additional funding from the Permanent University Fund, which now ensures full tuition coverage at The University of Texas at Austin for in-state students with need from families earning up to $65,000 per year and some guaranteed support for those from families earning up to $125,000 per year. In 2020, the Michael and Susan Dell Foundation made a historic gift of $100 million to expand resources and support for all Pell Grant eligible students at UT Austin.

In October 2019, students protested outside the provost's office, calling for more transparency and accountability when the university responds to alleged sexual misconduct violations. A month later, in a letter to the UT community, the university said it would hire “outside experts” to support efforts to address the issue. UT Austin subsequently formed a working group and hired an external law firm, Husch Blackwell, to review the university's sexual misconduct policies and its efforts to prevent and respond to allegations of sex discrimination. The firm concluded the first phase of its review and delivered recommendations, which Fenves accepted in March. Husch Blackwell continued its review and in July provided the university with additional recommendations.

Fenves conceived of a unique public-private partnership, which led to the construction of UT Austin's new basketball arena and events venue — now known as Moody Center, because of a $130 million gift from the Moody Foundation — which opened in late 2022.

On March 13, 2020, Fenves announced that his wife Carmel had contracted SARS-CoV-2 after a trip to New York City. In an open letter to UT Austin staff, faculty, and students, Fenves stated his wife began exhibiting flu-like symptoms after their trip, during which they attended several events with alumni and students, and was tested positive for COVID-19. Both Fenves, his wife, and an additional family member are in self-isolation, and the president has advised community members to follow CDC preventative measures against the spread of the virus.

Two days later, Fenves tested negative for coronavirus.

News outlets reported 3 weeks later, on April 7, 2020, that Fenves would be leaving the University of Texas at Austin to become the president of Emory University, succeeding outgoing president Claire E. Sterk.

Personal life 

Fenves' father's family are Jewish, and multiple members of his father's side are Holocaust survivors, including his father, sister, some cousins, and his grandfather.

References

American people of Jewish descent
Cornell University College of Engineering alumni
UC Berkeley College of Engineering alumni
UC Berkeley College of Engineering faculty
Presidents of the University of Texas at Austin
Place of birth missing (living people)
Living people
1957 births